Sabeq Mahalleh (also Romanized as Sābeq Maḩalleh; also known as Mehalleh and Sabeq) is a village in Ashrestaq Rural District, Yaneh Sar District, Behshahr County, Mazandaran Province, Iran. At the 2006 census, its population was 120, in 35 families.

References 

Populated places in Behshahr County